Brian George Miller (19 January 1937 – 7 April 2007) was a professional footballer and England international who played as a wing half.

Born in Hapton, Lancashire, Miller played only for Burnley during his career. He won his only international cap on 27 May 1961 in a 3–1 defeat to Austria.

He managed the Clarets between 1979 and 1983 and between 1986 and 1989. He helped them win the Third Division title during his first spell.

Miller died peacefully surrounded by his family in Burnley General Hospital at the age of 70 following a short illness. Miller spent five weeks in Burnley General Hospital with the illness before he died. A minute's silence in memory of Miller was observed prior to Burnley's game against Cardiff City on 9 April 2007.
During his first spell as manager at Burnley his son Dave played for Burnley and his daughter married club captain Derek Scott. Their sons, Chris and Paul, also pulled on the Claret shirt.

Honours

Player
Burnley
Football League First Division: 1959–60
FA Cup finalist: 1962

Manager
Burnley
Football League Third Division: 1981–82

References

External links

The Independent
https://web.archive.org/web/20101019040006/http://www.thelongside.info/content/view/811/106/
https://web.archive.org/web/20120929134304/http://www.burnleyfootballclub.com/page/LatestHeadlines/0%2C%2C10413~1879141%2C00.html
http://www.neilbrown.newcastlefans.com/player/brianmiller.html

1937 births
2007 deaths
English footballers
England international footballers
England under-23 international footballers
Burnley F.C. players
Burnley F.C. managers
English football managers
Footballers from Burnley
Association football wing halves
English Football League players
English Football League representative players
English Football League managers
FA Cup Final players